Ludmilla Ivanovna Tourischeva (Russian: Людми́ла Ива́новна Тури́щева; also transliterated as Ludmilla Turischeva, Ludmilla Tourischcheva, and Ljudmila Turichtchieva, born 7 October 1952) is a former Russian gymnast, Ukrainian gymnast coach, and a nine-time Olympic medalist for the Soviet Union.

Career
Tourischeva began gymnastics in 1965, at age 13, and began competing for the Soviet team in 1967. Coached by Vladislav Rastorotsky (who later trained Natalia Shaposhnikova and Natalia Yurchenko), she represented the Soviet Union at the 1968 Summer Olympics, just after her 16th birthday. She won the gold medal with the team and placed 24th in the all-around.

Two years later, Tourischeva became the leader of the Soviet team. From 1970 to 1974, she dominated almost every major international competition, winning the World Championships all-around gold in 1970 and 1974, the European Championships in 1971 and 1973, and the World Cup in 1975. She was considered to embody the classic Soviet style: grace, elegance, impeccable form, and strong technique.

At the 1972 Summer Olympics in Munich, Tourischeva won the all-around gold medal but was overshadowed by the sudden popularity of her younger compatriot Olga Korbut. She qualified for all four event finals, and won a silver and a bronze. Tourischeva was one of the first female gymnasts to use two separate pieces of music for her floor routines at an international competition. For the team competition, she used "March" from the film Circus by Isaak Dunaevsky, while for the all around, she used the music to the film Die Frau meiner Träume by Franz Grothe.

At the 1975 European Championships, Tourischeva placed fourth in the all-around behind 13-year-old Nadia Comăneci of Romania (who also won the vault, uneven bars, and balance beam apparatus finals), her own teammate Nellie Kim (who placed second and won the floor exercise final) and Annelore Zinke. This marked the first time in 5 years that Ludmilla lost an All-around competition.

After struggling with a back injury, Tourischeva competed in her third Olympics, the 1976 Summer Games in Montreal, where she won her third team gold with the Soviet squad. In the all-around, she finished third behind Comăneci and Kim. She won silver medals on vault and floor exercise in the event finals, losing to Kim but overcoming Comăneci, bringing her total Olympic medal count to four gold, three silver, and two bronze.

Tourischeva was known for her calm demeanor in competition. In 1980, British journalist David Hunn wrote that she "never had the cheek of some of her rivals, but for serenity she was supreme". This was famously illustrated during the 1975 World Cup at Wembley Stadium in London, when a broken hook holding support cables of the uneven bars caused the apparatus to fall apart and crash to the ground just as Tourischeva landed her dismount. Saluting the judges, she walked off the podium without even turning around to look at the remains of the apparatus. She went on to win the all-around and all four event finals. Years later, she said of the incident that, at that moment, she had thought only one thing: she must complete her routine and "stick it". Rastorotsky, her coach, said, "Ljudmila would fight to death in any situation."

She was also known for her gracious manner. At the 1976 Olympics, she walked around the podium to personally congratulate champion Comăneci and shake her hand before accepting her own medal.

Tourischeva is one of only two women, the other being Yelena Shushunova, who have won the "grand slam" of all-around titles: Olympics, World Championships, World Cup, and European Championships. She is also one of only two women to win four gold medals at a single World Championships (in 1974). The other is Simone Biles of the United States, who won four in 2014, 2015, and 2018; Biles broke the record and won five gold medals in 2019.

Post-gymnastics life 
In 1977, Tourischeva married the sprinter Valeriy Borzov, a two-time Olympic champion in 1972. She was elected to the Women's Artistic Gymnastics Technical Committee of the International Gymnastics Federation (FIG) in 1981, and has remained involved in gymnastics as a coach, an international judge, and an official with the Ukrainian gymnastics federation. One of her protégés was Lilia Podkopayeva of Ukraine, the all-around gold medalist at the 1996 Olympics.

Tourischeva has received various honors for her gymnastics career, including the Women in Sport trophy from the International Olympic Committee. In 1998, she was inducted into the International Gymnastics Hall of Fame.

Eponymous skill
Tourischeva has one eponymous skill listed in the Code of Points.

Medals (non-Olympic)

See also

List of multiple Olympic medalists
List of multiple Olympic gold medalists
List of multiple Summer Olympic medalists
List of top Olympic gymnastics medalists
List of top medalists at the World Artistic Gymnastics Championships
List of Olympic female gymnasts for the Soviet Union

References

External links

Article from "Soviet Life"
Full list of competitive results

1952 births
Living people
Russian female artistic gymnasts
Soviet female artistic gymnasts
Olympic gold medalists for the Soviet Union
Olympic silver medalists for the Soviet Union
Olympic bronze medalists for the Soviet Union
Olympic gymnasts of the Soviet Union
Olympic medalists in gymnastics
Gymnasts at the 1968 Summer Olympics
Gymnasts at the 1972 Summer Olympics
Gymnasts at the 1976 Summer Olympics
World champion gymnasts
Medalists at the World Artistic Gymnastics Championships
Dynamo sports society athletes
Sportspeople from Grozny
Medalists at the 1976 Summer Olympics
Medalists at the 1972 Summer Olympics
Medalists at the 1968 Summer Olympics
Originators of elements in artistic gymnastics
European champions in gymnastics